Tony Snell (born 1936) is a Cornish teacher, linguist, scholar, singer, waterman and poet born in England.  He spent many years teaching at St. Edward's School, Oxford. He became a member of Gorseth Kernow in 1954 under the Bardic name of Gwas Kevardhu (December's Man). During the 1970s, he led the folk group Tremenysy (Travellers).

His poetical work is influenced by the early poetry of Wales and Brittany, and it was he who adapted the Welsh traethodl to Cornish. Another influence is music, since a great deal of his work is song. He has won Gorseth Kernow competitions.

In c.1979 he and Dr Fred Pargeter started a new Morris dancing side at St Edward's School. The side involved over a dozen boys between 14–18 years old introducing them to folk music and traditional English country dancing.  The SESMM survived until for  around three years in which time they notched up many performances both around Oxfordshire and on tour to Cornwall (1980, 1981 and 1982).

Tony Snell also inspired many of the St Edward's pupils to involvement in folk music,copye with a number of bands created following Tremenysy, including Five Bar Gate, Treadmill and the Brown and Bitter Band.

References

Gorseth Byrth Kernow: Bards of the Gorsedd of Cornwall 1928-1967, Penzance, 1967.
Tony Snell, Pan dheuth an Glaw / When the Rain Came: Selected poems 1980 - 2005 in Cornish with translations, Kesva an Taves Kernewek / Cornish Language Board, Gwinear, 2007 
An Lef, Redruth, 1956
An Lef Kernewek, Redruth, 1983

1938 births
Bards of Gorsedh Kernow
Cornish-language writers
Cornish-speaking people
Cornish music
Cornish culture
Living people
Date of birth missing (living people)
Place of birth missing (living people)
Cornish folk singers